Karl Wallenda (January 21, 1905 – March 22, 1978) was a German-American high wire artist.  He was the founder of The Flying Wallendas, a daredevil circus troupe whose members performed dangerous stunts far above the ground, often without a safety net.

Personal life
Wallenda was born in 1905 in Magdeburg, Germany, the son of Kunigunde (Jameson) and Engelbert Wallenda. He began performing with his family at age six.

The Great Wallendas

The Great Wallendas were noted throughout Europe for their four-man pyramid and cycling on the high wire. The act moved to the United States in 1928, performing as freelancers. In 1947 they developed the unequaled three-tier 7-Man Pyramid. Karl Wallenda had the idea since 1938, but it took until 1946, when he and his brother Hermann developed it and had the right acrobats for it. The Great Wallendas, a 1978 made-for-TV movie starring Karl Wallenda, depicts the act's comeback after a fatal accident involving several family members during a performance. Wallenda was killed in a high wire accident just 38 days after it was first broadcast.

Daredevil stunts

On July 18, 1970, a 65-year-old Wallenda performed a high-wire walk, also known as a skywalk, across the Tallulah Gorge, a gorge formed by the Tallulah River in Georgia. An estimated 30,000 people watched Wallenda perform two headstands as he crossed the quarter-mile-wide gap.

Death
Despite being involved in several tragedies in his family's acts, Wallenda continued with his stunts. In 1978, at age 73, Wallenda attempted a walk between the two towers of the ten-story Condado Plaza Hotel in San Juan, Puerto Rico, on a wire stretched 121 ft (37 metres) above the pavement. As a result of high winds and an improperly secured wire, he lost his balance and fell during the attempt. Wallenda was pronounced dead after his body arrived at the hospital. This was not viewed on most television stations, but a film crew from local station WAPA-TV in San Juan taped the fall with narration by anchorman Guillermo José Torres.

Family members

Nik Wallenda, Karl's great-grandson, continues the family tradition of performing stunts on highwire without a safety net, while at times wearing a safety harness.
Mario Wallenda, adopted son of Karl, fell along with Karl during an attempt to perform the 7-Person Pyramid on January 30, 1962, leaving him paralyzed from the waist down.
Karl Wallenda established the Wallenda Dynasty with his two daughters, Jenny and Carla.
Jenny's children, Tino, Delilah, and Tammy, formed their own troupes.
Carla helped train her children Rick, Rietta, Mario, and Valerie. Rick and Rietta still perform today.  Valerie retired to raise her family and their brother Mario B. died in 1993.
The following great-grandchildren of Karl Wallenda perform today: Nik, Alida, Andrea, Aurelia, Alessandro "Alex", Lijana, and Lyric.

In popular culture
 Salsa singer Marvin Santiago made constant references to Wallenda's death in a few of his songs, mostly as side comments.
 Puerto Rican Reggaeton/Rap group Calle 13 make reference to Wallenda in their song Cabe-ce-o.
 The death of Wallenda's sister-in-law Rietta Wallenda is referred to in season 3 of the AMC program Mad Men, in the episode "Love Among the Ruins".
In the 1979 film All That Jazz, the protagonist (Roy Scheider) paraphrases Wallenda during a conversation about life in show business: "To be on the wire is life; the rest is waiting." 
The 1998 film Rounders references the quotation in a similar manner: "Like Papa Wallenda said, 'Life is on the wire, the rest is just waiting.'"
 A more elegant version of this quote is attributed to Wallenda by sociologist Erving Goffman in his 1967 essay 'Where the Action is': "To be on the wire is life; the rest is waiting."
 Athens, Georgia band  Drive-By Truckers references the Wallendas in their song The Flying Wallendas on their 2010 album The Big To-Do.
 Karl Wallenda is mentioned in Tom Robbins' book Villa Incognito as well as in Stephen King's books Gerald's Game and The Tommyknockers.
 Folk/alternative singer/songwriter Bill Mallonee includes references to the Great Wallenda stepping out over Tallulah Gorge in his song "Balaam's Ass" from the 1995 audio album Blister Soul, by the Vigilantes of Love.
British guitarist and composer Mike Walker wrote 'Wallenda's last stand' for The Impossible Gentleman's self-titled album on Basho records.
Poet Raymond Carver wrote the eponymous "Poem for Karl Wallenda, Aerialist Supreme".
Motivational business journalist Harvey Mackay references Wallenda in his August 30, 2016 syndicated newspaper article entitled "Fear factor can create positives from the negatives". Mackay quotes Karl's widow commenting on her late husband's death as saying: "All Karl thought about for 3 straight months prior to the accident was falling. It seemed to me he put all his energy into not falling - not into walking the tightrope."
Karl Wallenda was mentioned in an episode of Last Man Standing as a part of one of the "Outdoor Man" blogs.
Fictional General Secretary of the Soviet Union, Andrey Il'ych Narmanov is compared to Karl Wallenda in Tom Clancy’s The Sum of All Fears.
In 1972 Karl Wallenda appeared on flagship BBC children's magazine programme Blue Peter, walking a wire across the BBC studios. The segment was hosted by John Noakes. It also appeared in the end of year review show, Blue Peter, Review of the Year 1972.
In the 2012 drama film Wallenda, the movie focuses on Karl Wallenda during his youthful years and his beginning stages of joining the circus during the 1920's.

See also

 Tightrope walking

References

External links
 The Biography of Karl Wallenda by Ron Morris.
The Wallenda family's site
Rick Wallenda site
Karl Wallenda at Find a Grave

1905 births
1978 deaths
Tightrope walkers
Accidental deaths from falls
Accidental deaths in Puerto Rico
Filmed deaths from falls
Filmed deaths in the United States
German emigrants to the United States
German stunt performers
Filmed deaths of entertainers
The Flying Wallendas